Lino Carletto (born 20 July 1943) is an Italian racing cyclist. He rode in the 1969 Tour de France.

References

External links
 

1943 births
Living people
Italian male cyclists
Place of birth missing (living people)
Cyclists from the Province of Verona